Visual Resources is a quarterly peer-reviewed academic journal covering art theory, digital art history, and art historiography published by Routledge. It was established in 1980 and the editor-in-chief is Barbara Pezzini (University of Manchester).

Abstracting and indexing 
The journal is abstracted and indexed in Bibliography of the History of Art, British Humanities Index, EBSCO databases, and Scopus.

References

External links 

Routledge academic journals
Quarterly journals
Visual art journals
Publications established in 1980
English-language journals